Cynthia Belliveau (born February 18, 1963) is a Canadian actress. She is best known for her television roles as Terri Morgan in E.N.G., Honey Bailey in Wind at My Back and Dori Lowe in Caitlin's Way. She was a Gemini Award nominee for Canadian Screen Award for Best Actress in a Continuing Leading Dramatic Role at the 12th Gemini Awards in 1998 for Wind at My Back.

She retired from acting in 2002 after having relocated to Los Angeles, California to pursue a career in interior design. She also opened an antique store.

Early Life 

Originally from Stratford, Ontario, Belliveau was a Miss Teen Canada contestant in 1982 and a Miss Canada contestant in 1983, and worked as a reporter for CKCO-TV in Kitchener, prior to her career as an actress. She was educated at the University of Waterloo.

Filmography

Film

Television

References

External links

1963 births
Canadian television actresses
Canadian film actresses
Canadian stage actresses
Canadian beauty pageant contestants
Actresses from Ontario
People from Stratford, Ontario
Canadian television reporters and correspondents
Franco-Ontarian people
University of Waterloo alumni
Living people
Canadian women television journalists